The 1936 Carnegie Tech Tartans football team represented the Carnegie Institute of Technology—now known as Carnegie Mellon University—as an independent during the 1936 college football season. Led by Howard Harpster in his fourth and final season as head coach, the Tartans compiled a record of 2–6. Carnegie Tech played home games at Pitt Stadium in Pittsburgh.

Schedule

References

Carnegie Tech
Carnegie Mellon Tartans football seasons
Carnegie Tech Tartans football